Edward Burke may refer to:

Government and politics 
Edward A. Burke (1839–1928), Louisiana State Treasurer
Edward T. Burke (1870–1935), North Dakota Supreme Court justice
Edward J. Burke (1876–?), Wisconsin legislator
Edward R. Burke (1880–1968), American politician
Edward M. Burke (born 1943), Chicago, Illinois Alderman

Sports 
Eddie Burke (baseball) (1866–1907), American baseball player
Edward Burke (American football) (1907–1967), selected to the 1928 College Football All-America Team
Edward Burke (cricketer) (born 1870), Jamaican cricketer
Ed Burke (hammer thrower) (born 1940), hammer thrower, American flagbearer at 1984 Olympic games
Edward Burke (basketball) (1945–2009), American basketball coach
Ted Burke (1877–1967),  Australian rules footballer

Others
 Edward Burke (priest) (1847–1915), priest, president of Carlow College, and founder of St. Joseph's Academy
 Ed Burke (musician) (1909–1988), American musician

See also
 Edmund Burke (disambiguation)
 Edward C. Burks (1821–1897), American jurist